The Fort Worth and Western Railroad  is a Class III short-line railroad headquartered in Fort Worth, Texas.  Operating only within the state of Texas, its main freight service route is between Carrollton, Fort Worth and Brownwood.

History
Much of the company's route originally belonged to the Fort Worth and Rio Grande Railway, which began construction from Fort Worth in 1886 and reached Brownwood in 1891.  In 1901, the FW&RG was bought by the Frisco Railway, which sold it to the Santa Fe Railway in 1937.  The Santa Fe sold the line to an affiliate of the South Orient Railroad in 1994.

By the mid-1990s, the railroad operated  of track, the result of numerous minor acquisitions. In 1996, the FWWR more than doubled its total trackage with the lease of a  route from Dallas Area Rapid Transit, and in 1998 purchased  of track from South Orient Railroad, now Texas Pacifico Transportation. The FWWR leased two Union Pacific Railroad properties, a yard and branch line, in 2002 and 2003 respectively.

Route
Since 2007, the railroad has been in the process of resurfacing its trackage, as well as installing new sidings and upgrading the route, eventually to allow  speeds over the entire line.

Company
On December 27, 2010, Fort Worth and Western named Thomas Schlosser as president and CEO, who took over from Steven George, who had held the position since 2000; the company's vice president and COO is Richard Green. On August 19, 2015, Fort Worth and Western named Kevin Erasmus as president and CEO, who took over from Thomas Schlosser, who held the position since 2010.  The company employs around 85 people. The company also operates the Grapevine Vintage Railroad, a tourist train that runs between downtown Grapevine, Texas and the Fort Worth Stockyards

Fleet
As of January of 2019, the Fort Worth and Western's locomotive fleet (past and present) consists of the following:

References

External links

 Fort Worth and Western Railroad

Texas railroads
Switching and terminal railroads
Spin-offs of the Burlington Northern Railroad
Railway companies established in 1988